Caspase recruitment domain-containing protein 8 is a protein that in humans is encoded by the CARD8 gene.

Function 

Caspase recruitment domain (CARD)-containing proteins, such as CARD8, are involved in pathways leading to activation of caspases or nuclear factor kappa-B (NF-κB) in the context of apoptosis or inflammation, respectively.

References

Further reading